Košarkarski klub Grosuplje or simply KK Grosuplje is a basketball team based in Grosuplje, Slovenia. The team plays in the Slovenian Third League, the third tier of Slovenian basketball.

In 2012–13, 2013–14 and 2014–15, Grosuplje played in the Slovenian top division.

References

External links
Official website 

Basketball teams established in 1997
Basketball teams in Slovenia
1997 establishments in Slovenia